Nosratabad is a city in Sistan and Baluchestan Province, Iran.

Nosratabad or Nasratabad may also refer to:

Alborz Province
Nosratabad, Alborz, a village in Nazarabad County, Alborz Province, Iran

East Azerbaijan Province
Nosratabad, Malekan, a village in Malekan County
Nosratabad-e Laklar, a village in Malekan County
Nosratabad, Tabriz, a village in Tabriz County

Fars Province
Nosratabad, Fars, a village in Darab County

Golestan Province
Nosratabad, Aliabad, a village in Aliabad County
Nosratabad, Aqqala, a village in Aqqala County

Hamadan Province
Nosratabad, Hamadan, a village in Malayer County
Nosratabad-e Behraz, a village in Asadabad County
Nosratabad-e Laklak, a village in Asadabad County

Kerman Province
Nosratabad, Anar, a village in Anar County
Nosratabad-e Seh Dangeh, a village in Arzuiyeh County
Nosratabad, Rabor, a village in Rabor County
Nosratabad, Estabraq, a village in Shahr-e Babak County
Nosratabad, Sirjan, a village in Sirjan County

Kermanshah Province
Nosratabad, Kermanshah, a village in Sonqor County

Kurdistan Province
Nosratabad, Kamyaran, a village in Kamyaran County
Nosratabad, Sanandaj, a village in Sanandaj County

Lorestan Province
Nosratabad, Azna, a village in Azna County
Nosratabad, Delfan, a village in Delfan County
Nosratabad-e Olya, a village in Delfan County
Nosratabad-e Sofla, a village in Delfan County

Markazi Province
Nosratabad, Mahallat, a village in Mahallat County, Markazi Province, Iran

Mazandaran Province
Nosratabad, Galugah, a village in Galugah County
Nosratabad, Nur, a village in Nur County

Qazvin Province
Nosratabad, Qazvin, a village in Alborz County
Nosratabad Rural District (Qazvin Province), an administrative subdivision
Nosratabad, Abgarm, a village in Buin Zahra County
Nosratabad, Dashtabi, a village in Buin Zahra County
Nosratabad-e Bayeh, a village in Buin Zahra County

Razavi Khorasan Province
Nosratabad, Bakharz, a village in Bakharz County
Nosratabad, Dargaz, a village in Dargaz County
Nosratabad, alternate name of Nasrabad, Razavi Khorasan, a city in Razavi Khorasan Province, Iran
Nosratabad, Quchan, a village in Quchan County
Nosratabad, Torbat-e Heydarieh, a village in Torbat-e Heydarieh County

Sistan and Baluchestan Province
Nosratabad, a city
Nosratabad District, an administrative subdivision of Iran

South Khorasan Province
Nosratabad, Nehbandan, a village in Nehbandan County
Nosratabad, Tabas, a village in Tabas County

Tehran Province
Nosratabad, Tehran, a village in Shahriar County

West Azerbaijan Province
Nosratabad, West Azerbaijan, a village in Poldasht County
Nosratabad, Takab, a village in Takab County

Yazd Province

Zanjan Province
Nosratabad, Zanjan, a village in Khodabandeh County

See also
Nosratabad Rural District (disambiguation), administrative subdivisions of Iran